The 2013–14 Spor Toto Turkish Cup was the 28th season of the Turkish Basketball Cup. Pınar Karşıyaka won their first title by beating Anadolu Efes in the final.

Bracket

Quarterfinals

Semifinals

Final

External links 

Turkish Cup Basketball seasons
Cup